Minions is a village in Cornwall, England, United Kingdom. It is situated on the eastern flank of Bodmin Moor northwest of Caradon Hill approximately four miles (6 km) north of Liskeard. Minions is first recorded in 1613 and its meaning is unknown.

A stone circle known as the Hurlers is located on the west side of the village. Several other tumuli are also in the area, including Rillaton round barrow, where a Bronze Age gold beaker was discovered. The Cheesewring, a distinctive rock formation, is a mile northwest.

The village has embraced the coincidence that its name is now shared with the characters from the Despicable Me franchise.

Geography
Minions is in the former Caradon administrative district and in the parish of Linkinhorne.  At  it is said to be the highest village in Cornwall.

As a result, there is a road leading up to the summit from Minions. On the western flank of the hill, a quarry recently started up again, cutting granite boulders.

As well as this working quarry, there are many other disused quarries and mine buildings in the area due to the village's mining heritage, including the Phoenix United Mine that closed in 1914. Unlike in the west of Cornwall, there are no plans to reopen the tin and copper mines in the area.

Climate
The climate of Minions is Oceanic but, like the rest of Bodmin Moor, due to its higher altitude, it is often cooler, windier and wetter. However, there is a good balance of fair days too, which can get warm in the summer. In winter frosts are common and even though it snows most years, it is never prolonged or severe.

Winter:6c/1c

Spring:14c/6c

Summer:20c/12c

Autumn:12c/3c

Rainy days:173

Snowfalls:2-4

Community facilities
The village has two main car parks, located on the western and eastern edges on the village. There are two tearooms, a pub with B&B, and a general store which also holds a post office, one of the tearooms and a B&B. A museum dedicated to the mining history of the local area is located to the north of the village in a disused engine house.

Popular culture

In May 2015, a road sign was erected outside the village in tribute to the then-forthcoming Minions movie. This sign was removed later the same year for safety reasons, due to families stopping on the narrow road to take photographs. Local residents fought for the "tourism-boosting" sign to stay, stating that it had "put Minions on the map." Calls for the colourful sign to be reinstated received strong support, with an anonymous member of the public placing stickers of the popular characters on the original sign.

Filming for Miss Peregrine's Home for Peculiar Children took place in 2015.

Gallery

References

Villages in Cornwall
Bodmin Moor